Llallawani (Aymara llallawa a monstrous potato (like two potatoes) or animal, -ni a suffix, "the one with the monstrous pototo", also spelled Llallguani) is a  mountain in the Andes of Bolivia. It is located in the Oruro Department, Challapata Province, Challapata Municipality.

References 

Mountains of Oruro Department